Millennium Center is an office, hotel and residential building in Sofia. As of March 2020, it is the second tallest building in the city and Bulgaria, after the Capital Fort building, but with its 32 floors it is the highest by floor count in the country.

See also 
 List of tallest buildings in Sofia
 List of tallest buildings in Bulgaria
 List of tallest structures in Bulgaria
 List of tallest buildings in Europe
 List of tallest buildings in the European Union

References

External links 
 Official site
 List of tallest buildings in Sofia

Residential buildings in Bulgaria
Office buildings in Bulgaria
Skyscrapers in Sofia